The 2019–20 Egypt Cup was the 88th edition of the oldest recognised football tournament in Africa. It is sponsored by Tiger Chips, and known as the Tiger Egypt Cup for sponsorship purposes. It started with the First Preliminary Round on 15 October 2019, and concluded with the final on 5 December 2020.

Egyptian Premier League side Zamalek, who had won the last two titles, were eliminated by Tala'ea El Gaish in the semi-finals following a 3–1 defeat after extra time.

Al Ahly defeated Tala'ea El Gaish in the final won the match 3–2 on penalties, after the original and extra time ended 1–1, winning their 37th Egypt Cup title.

On 14 March 2020, a decision was made by the Egyptian Football Association to postpone all football activities in Egypt due to the spread of the COVID-19 pandemic in the country. The initial suspension, until 29 March, was then extended multiple times until at least mid-July. On 2 July 2020, the EFA announced that football competitions in Egypt would resume, with the Premier League recommencing on 6 August, Second Division on 21 September and Egypt Cup on 30 September. The EFA also confirmed that all clubs' players and staff would be tested for COVID-19 before resuming training.

Teams

Round and draw dates
The schedule is as follows.

Format

Participation
The Egypt Cup began with a round of 32 teams. The 18 teams of the Egyptian Premier League, along with the 14 winning teams qualified from the Fifth Preliminary Round of the 2019–20 Egypt Cup qualifying rounds.

Draw
The draw for the main competition was held at the Egyptian Football Association headquarters in Gezira, Cairo on 24 November 2019 and was broadcast live on ON Sport.

The 32 participating teams were separated into 3 pots. Pot 1 included the 15th placed team from the previous season of the Egyptian Premier League alongside the 3 promoted teams from the 2018–19 Egyptian Second Division, Pot 2 included the top 14 teams from the previous season of the Egyptian Premier League, and Pot 3 included all 14 teams who qualified to the competition through the qualifying rounds.

Teams from Pot 1 were drawn against each other, while teams from Pot 2 were drawn against teams from Pot 3.

Similar to previous season, the Egypt Cup defending champions, Zamalek, and the Egyptian Premier League champions, Al Ahly, were placed in different paths; meaning that both teams can face each other only in the final.

Match rules
Teams meet in one game per round. Matches take place for 90 minutes, with two-halves of 45 minutes. If still tied after regulation, 30 minutes of extra time will be played, consisting of two periods of 15 minutes. If the score is still level after this, the match will be decided by a penalty shoot-out. A coin toss will decide who takes the first penalty. A total of seven players are allowed to be listed on the substitute bench, with up to three substitutions being allowed during regulation.

All matches will be played on venues selected by the Egyptian Football Association except in the Round of 32, where matches will be hosted by the team drawn first.

Champion qualification
The winners of the Egypt Cup will earn automatic qualification for the 2020–21 CAF Confederation Cup. If they have already qualified for the CAF Confederation Cup or CAF Champions League through their position in the Egyptian Premier League, then the spot will go to the cup runners-up. If the cup runners-up also qualified for an African competition through their league position, then the spot will be given to the fourth placed team in the league.

Qualifying rounds

All of the competing teams that are not members of the Egyptian Premier League had to compete in the qualifying rounds to secure one of 14 available places in the Round of 32. The qualifying phase began with the First Preliminary Round on 15 October 2019, and concluded with the Fifth Preliminary Round on 23 November 2019.

Round of 32
The matches were played from 2 to 8 December 2019. This round included four teams from the Egyptian Third Division, Al Jazeera, Al Obour, Qena and El Sharkia, the lowest ranking sides left in the competition.

All times are CAT (UTC+2).

Round of 16
The matches were played between 15 February and 5 October 2020. Matches involving Al Ahly and Zamalek were postponed to avoid scheduling conflicts with their postponed league games. This round included two teams from the Egyptian Second Division, Abou Qir Fertilizers and Tersana, the lowest ranking sides left in the competition.

All times are CAT (UTC+2).

Quarter-finals
The matches were played from 14 October to 21 November 2020. This round included one team from the Egyptian Second Division, Abou Qir Fertilizers, the lowest ranking side left in the competition.

All times are CAT (UTC+2).

Semi-finals
The matches were played on 1 December 2020.

All times are CAT (UTC+2).

Final

Bracket
The following is the bracket which the Egypt Cup resembles. Numbers in parentheses next to the match score represent the results of a penalty shoot-out.

Top goalscorers

References

Notes

 
Egypt Cup
Egypt
Association football events postponed due to the COVID-19 pandemic